Roger Elliott Salmon (May 11, 1891 - June 17, 1974), was an American professional baseball pitcher who played in  with the Philadelphia Athletics of Major League Baseball. He batted and threw left-handed. Salmon had a 1–0 record, with a 9.00 ERA, in two games, in his one-year career.

Biography
He was born in Newark, New Jersey on May 11, 1891. Salmon played college baseball at Princeton University.  He died in Belfast, Maine on June 17, 1974.

References

External links

1891 births
1974 deaths
Major League Baseball pitchers
Baseball players from Newark, New Jersey
Philadelphia Athletics players
Princeton Tigers baseball players
People from Belfast, Maine
Wilmington Chicks players
Holyoke Papermakers players
Hartford Senators players